The 1907–08 season was the 14th in the history of Southern Football League. Queens Park Rangers won Division One, whilst Bradford Park Avenue and Tottenham Hotspur were elected to the Football League. Southend United won Division Two and were promoted to Division One. At the end of the season all the reserve teams left Division Two.

Division One

A total of 20 teams contest the division, including 19 sides from previous season and one new team.

Newly elected teams:
 Bradford Park Avenue

Division Two

A total of 10 teams contest the division, including 8 sides from previous season and two new teams, both of them are newly elected teams.

Newly elected teams:
 Croydon Common
 Brighton & Hove Albion II

Football League elections
Three Southern League clubs, Bradford Park Avenue, Queens Park Rangers and Tottenham Hotspur, applied for election to the Football League, although QPR later withdrew their application. Bradford PA were successful in the ballot, and replaced Lincoln City in the League. However, Stoke later resigned from the League, and a special meeting was arranged to elect a new member. Although at the meeting Stoke stated that they wished to remain in the League, a ballot was still held, in which Stoke and Tottenham won 20 votes (Rotherham County and Southport Central were also involved), after which the management committee voted 5-3 in favour of Tottenham.

References

1907-08
1907–08 in English association football leagues